Gary B. Smith is a British-American executive, currently serving as the Chief Executive Officer of Ciena, an American telecommunications networking multinational.

Early life and education
Smith was born in Birmingham, United Kingdom, and received an MBA from the Ashridge Management College, now part of Hult International Business School.

Career
From 1995-1997, Smith served as vice president for sales and marketing at Intelsat, a global provider of fixed satellite services. He also previously served as vice president of sales and marketing for Cray Communications, Inc.

Ciena 
Smith joined Ciena in 1997 and has served as president and CEO since May 2001. Prior to serving as CEO, Smith served as Ciena's chief operating officer; and prior to that, senior vice president of worldwide sales. Smith joined Ciena in November 1997 as vice president of international sales. He has served on Ciena's board of directors since October 2000.

During his tenure as CEO, Smith has led the acquisition of seven companies.  Most recent is the acquisition of the Optical Networking and Carrier Ethernet assets of bankrupt Nortel's Metro Ethernet Networks (MEN) for $774 million. This acquisition, which closed on March 19, 2010, doubled Ciena's size from around 2,100 to 4,000 employees and significantly increased total revenues.  In November 2011, Smith was interviewed by Light Reading about Ciena's acquisition history.

Since the first full year of Smith's tenure as CEO, Ciena's revenues have gone from $361 million in fiscal year ended 2002 to $2.1 billion in fiscal 2013.

Additional affiliations and memberships 
In January 2011, the White House named Smith to its National Security Telecommunications Advisory Committee (NSTAC).  NSTAC's mission is to provide the president collaborative advice and expertise regarding telecommunications national security and emergency preparedness issues.

Smith is also a commissioner of the Global Information Infrastructure Commission, a confederation of communications technology business executives engaged in telecommunications policy.  In addition, he is a Broadband Ambassador to the Internet Innovation Alliance, a coalition of business and nonprofit leaders devoted to making broadband universally accessible.

Smith is a member of the Wall Street Journal CEO Council.

Smith serves on the Wake Forest University Advisory Council for Innovation, Creativity and Entrepreneurship.

In addition to Ciena's board of directors, Smith also serves on several other corporate boards. On December 7, 2011, Avaya, a global provider of business communications and collaboration systems and services, appointed Smith to its board of directors. Smith also serves as a director of CommVault Systems, a provider of data and information management software applications and related services with a market capitalization of $2 billion.  Smith has served as a director of CommVault since May 2004 and as lead director since May 2006.

Awards and recognitions

In November 2011, industry publication Light Reading inducted Smith into their Light Reading Hall of Fame, based primarily on his achievements and "staying power" during his 10 years as CEO of Ciena.

Personal life
Smith now resides in Maryland with his wife and two sons, and has dual citizenship in the United States and United Kingdom. He is an avid photographer.

References

External links 
 Executive profile at Ciena

British businesspeople
American businesspeople
Hult International Business School alumni
Living people
Year of birth missing (living people)